David Lindsey Skaggs (born June 12, 1951) is an American former Major League Baseball catcher. He played all or part of four seasons, from  until , for the Baltimore Orioles and California Angels. As a member of the Orioles, he was the last Oriole to wear #8 before Cal Ripken Jr.

Skaggs was the starting catcher in game 4 of the 1979 World Series against the Pittsburgh Pirates, a game in which the Orioles won 9-6.

The Dave Skaggs family would appear later in the 1980s on an episode of the popular game show Family Feud.

Sources

Major League Baseball catchers
Baltimore Orioles players
California Angels players
Aberdeen Pheasants players
Stockton Ports players
Miami Orioles players
Lodi Lions players
Asheville Orioles players
Rochester Red Wings players
San Bernardino Pride players
Baseball players from California
1951 births
Living people